Stanley Howard Wallace (November 15, 1931 – December 6, 1999) was a defensive back for the Chicago Bears of the National Football League (NFL). After playing college football for the Illinois Fighting Illini, he was drafted in the first round (6th overall) of the 1954 NFL Draft. He played for four years as a defensive back, catching 10 interceptions over his career.

He played his last two seasons with the Toronto Argonauts of the Canadian Football League (CFL), playing 24 regular season and 4 playoff games, and catching 9 passes and intercepting 3 passes. He was an East Division All-Star in 1960.

References

External links
Stan Wallace's stats at NFL.com

1931 births
1999 deaths
American football defensive backs
Chicago Bears players
Illinois Fighting Illini football players
People from Hillsboro, Illinois
Players of American football from Illinois
Toronto Argonauts players